Neofidia texana is a species of leaf beetle that is found in North America. It occurs in central and east-central Texas, and is associated with plants in the grape family (Vitaceae). Neofidia texana was first described as a variety of Fidia viticida by the American entomologist Charles Frederic August Schaeffer in 1934. It is now considered to be a separate species.

References

Further reading

 

Eumolpinae
Articles created by Qbugbot
Beetles described in 1934
Beetles of the United States
Taxa named by Charles Frederic August Schaeffer